Crest High School is a public high school in Shelby, North Carolina. It is part of the Cleveland County Schools district.

Overview
Crest High School has 1,262 students from grades 912. As of the 201112 school year, there are 87.57 teachers (FTE basis) and the student/faculty ratio is 14.41. Its campus is fringe rural. The Crest Chargers currently compete in the Big South Conference and are classified as 3A in the North Carolina High School Athletic Association (NCHSAA).

History
The school was approved in 1965, after Cleveland County residents voted 3,420 to 1,615 to authorize 3,250,000 in construction bonds for two new high schools. Crest High School would open in the fall of 1967. In 198687, Crest High School was a Blue Ribbon School. The word "CREST" was originally an acronym for "Cleveland Rural Education Stands Together".

Notable alumni
 Jonathan Bullard – NFL defensive end
 Charlie Harbison – American football coach
 Tre Harbison – NFL running back
 Manteo Mitchell – American track and field athlete, won silver medal at the 2012 Summer Olympics
 Kevin "PPMD" Nanney – professional Super Smash Bros. Melee player
 Dawson Odums – college football head coach
 Travis Padgett – American track and field sprint athlete, competed at the 2008 Summer Olympics
 Ron Rash – American poet, short story writer, and novelist
 Brandon Spikes – NFL linebacker
 David Thompson – NBA player, 4-time NBA All-Star and NCAA champion with NC State Wolfpack

References

Public high schools in North Carolina
Educational institutions established in 1965
1965 establishments in North Carolina